The 2017 College Basketball Invitational (CBI) was a single-elimination tournament of 16 National Collegiate Athletic Association (NCAA) Division I teams that did not participate  on the 2017 NCAA Men's Division I Basketball Tournament or the NIT. The opening games were held on March 15 and the quarterfinals were held on March 20 on campus sites. After the quarterfinals, the brackets were reseeded for the semi-finals which was held on March 22. A best of three championship series closed out the tournament on March 27, 29, and 31.

Participants
The following teams were announced as participants Sunday, March 12 after the NCAA Selection Show.

Declined invitations 
The following team declined an invitation to the 2017 CBI:

 Auburn

Schedule
Source:

Bracket

Home teams listed first.

References

College Basketball Invitational
College Basketball Invitational